Preincarnate is a 2010 novella written by Australian author and comedian Shaun Micallef with illustrations by Bill Wood. It focuses upon the intricacies of time travel, suspended animation and one man's journey across various time eras.

Synopsis
"Suppose you were murdered and then woke up 300 years earlier in someone else's body. Wouldn't you want to put yourself in suspended animation and be re-awoken in time to prevent yourself from being murdered in the first place? This is the extraordinary tale of an ordinary man in a race across Time."

References

2010 Australian novels